Pre-Creedence is a compilation album by The Golliwogs which changed its name to Creedence Clearwater Revival (CCR) in 1968.  This album was released in 1975 after the band had disbanded.

The album consists of tracks recorded and released under the band's prior name, although the final two songs on the album, originally released in 1967 as a Golliwogs single, were re-released as the first CCR single in 1968.

All tracks were reissued on CD as part of Creedence Clearwater Revival: Box Set.

Track listing
All songs written by John Fogerty and Tom Fogerty, except as indicated.
"Don't Tell Me No Lies" – 1:55
"Little Girl (Does Your Mama Know)" – 2:40
"Where You Been" – 2:25
"You Came Walking" – 1:49
"You Can't Be True" – 2:41
"You Got Nothin' on Me" – 2:11
"Brown-Eyed Girl" – 2:26
"You Better Be Careful" – 2:19
"Fight Fire" – 2:22
"Fragile Child" – 2:36
"Walking on the Water" – 2:29
"You Better Get It Before It Gets You" – 2:49
"Porterville" – 2:20 (John Fogerty)
"Call It Pretending" – 2:07 (John Fogerty)

Personnel

John Fogerty — lead guitar, vocals; lead vocals (tracks 7, 10-14)
Tom Fogerty — rhythm guitar, vocals; lead vocals (tracks 1-6, 8, 9)
Stu Cook — bass
Doug Clifford — drums

References

Creedence Clearwater Revival compilation albums
1975 compilation albums
Fantasy Records compilation albums
Albums produced by John Fogerty